Gilchrist's was a Boston department store.  Its flagship store was at the intersection of Washington and Winter Streets, across from both Filene's and Jordan Marsh in Downtown Crossing.

Gilchrist's was considered one of the big three stores (along with Filene's and Jordan Marsh) that dominated Boston's shopping district for so long.  Gilchrist's opened in 1842, one year after Jordan Marsh in downtown Boston.  Gilchrist's was not considered as high-end as its neighbors, but did just as well.

In the 1940s Gilchrist's started to branch out into older suburban communities.  By 1964 Gilchrist's had eight locations across the state of Massachusetts: Quincy, Brockton, Framingham, Medford, Waltham, Stoneham, Cambridge, and Dorchester.  The company's store in Cambridge was located in the basement of the Star Market grocery store at the Porter Square shopping center.

The emergence of shopping malls led to the decline of the downtown stores.  Gilchrist's took a back seat to the anchor stores until closing in 1977. Its flagship Downtown Crossing store was replaced with a shopping mall called The Corner in Gilchrist's original building.

Defunct department stores based in Massachusetts
Retail companies established in 1842
1977 disestablishments in Massachusetts
Companies based in Boston